This is a list of official football games played by Iran national football team between 1970 and 1979.

1970
1970 RCD Cup

1970 Asian Games – Preliminary Round

1970 Asian Games – Preliminary Round

1971
Friendly

Friendly

1972
1972 AFC Asian Cup – Group Allocation Matches

1972 AFC Asian Cup – Preliminary Round

1972 AFC Asian Cup – Preliminary Round

1972 AFC Asian Cup – Semifinal

1972 AFC Asian Cup – Final

1972 Brazil Independence Cup – Preliminary Round

1972 Brazil Independence Cup – Preliminary Round

1972 Brazil Independence Cup – Preliminary Round

1972 Brazil Independence Cup – Preliminary Round

1973
1974 FIFA World Cup Qualifier – First Round

1974 FIFA World Cup Qualifier – First Round

1974 FIFA World Cup Qualifier – First Round

1974 FIFA World Cup Qualifier – First Round

1974 FIFA World Cup Qualifier – First Round

1974 FIFA World Cup Qualifier – First Round

Friendly

1974 FIFA World Cup Qualifier – Second Round

1974 FIFA World Cup Qualifier – Second Round

1974
1974 Asian Games – Preliminary Round

1974 Asian Games – Preliminary Round

1974 Asian Games – Preliminary Round

1974 Asian Games – Semifinal

1974 Asian Games – Semifinal

1974 Asian Games – Semifinal

1974 Asian Games – Final

Friendly

1975
Friendly

1976
1976 AFC Asian Cup – Preliminary Round

1976 AFC Asian Cup – Preliminary Round

1976 AFC Asian Cup – Semifinal

1976 AFC Asian Cup – Final

Friendly

1977
1978 FIFA World Cup Qualifier – First Round

1978 FIFA World Cup Qualifier – First Round

Friendly

75th Anniversary of Real Madrid – Semifinal

1978 FIFA World Cup Qualifier – First Round

''* Syria didn't show up.

1978 FIFA World Cup Qualifier – First Round

1978 FIFA World Cup Qualifier – Final Round

1978 FIFA World Cup Qualifier – Final Round

Friendly

1978 FIFA World Cup Qualifier – Final Round

1978 FIFA World Cup Qualifier – Final Round

1978 FIFA World Cup Qualifier – Final Round

1978 FIFA World Cup Qualifier – Final Round

1978 FIFA World Cup Qualifier – Final Round

1978 FIFA World Cup Qualifier – Final Round

1978
Friendly

Friendly

Friendly

Friendly

1978 Afro-Asian Cup of Nations

1978 FIFA World Cup – Preliminary Round

1978 FIFA World Cup – Preliminary Round

1978 FIFA World Cup – Preliminary Round

Friendly

Statistics

Results by year

Managers

Opponents

External links
 www.teammelli.com
 www.fifa.com

football
1970s
1970–71 in Iranian football
1971–72 in Iranian football
1972–73 in Iranian football
1973–74 in Iranian football
1974–75 in Iranian football
1976–77 in Iranian football
1977–78 in Iranian football